The following article comprises the results of the Hockeyroos, the women's national field hockey team from Australia, from 2011 until 2015. New fixtures can be found on the International Hockey Federation's results portal.

Match results

2011 Results

Four Nations Tournament (Mendoza)

Four Nations Tournament (Rosario)

Argentina Test Series

Four Nations Tournament (Bremen)

Champions Trophy

Oceania Cup

India Test Series

China Test Series

2012 Results

United States Test Series

Netherlands Test Series

Germany Test Match

Japan Test Match

Korea Test Series

United States Test Series

Four Nations Tournament (North Harbour)

Four Nations Tournament (Auckland)

Great Britain Test Series

Investec Cup

Olympic Games

Champions Challenge I

2013 Results

South Africa Test Match

Investec Cup

Korea Test Series

Belgium Test Match

Hockey World League Semifinals

Argentina Test Series

International Super Series Hockey 9's

Canada Test Series

Oceania Cup

Hockey World League Final

2014 Results

South Africa Test Series

Japan Test Series

Hawke's Bay Cup

Four Nations Invitational Tournament

Belgium Test Match

Hockey World Cup

XX Commonwealth Games

New Zealand Test Series

Champions Trophy

2015 Results

China Test Series

Hawke's Bay Cup

Hockey World League Semifinals

Korea Test Series

Oceania Cup

Hockey World League Final

References

Australia women's national field hockey team